The Seomjingang River is a river in South Korea.  It drains southeastern Jeollabuk-do as well as eastern Jeollanam-do and western Gyeongsangnam-do provinces, and flows into the Korea Strait.  The Seomjin rises from Palgongsan and flows for 212.3 kilometers before reaching its final destination in Gwangyang, where it enters Gwangyang Bay.

The Seomjingang watershed comprises some 4,896.5 km².  This area includes both farmland and a great deal of pristine mountain country, including the Jirisan area.  A wide variety of animals are found along the river, including the European otter, Lutra lutra.  Principal tributaries include the Boseong River and Yocheon stream.

The name "Seomjin" literally means "toad ferry."  This name is believed to date from Hideyoshi's invasions of Korea in the 1590s.  According to legend, a swarm of toads blocked the Japanese army from crossing the Seomjin into northern Jeolla.

In August 2020, consecutive days of heavier-than-usual rainfall caused the river to overflow and a levee on river collapsed, resulting in massive flooding. Thousands of residents who lived in villages and towns along the river were left homeless as entire communities were submerged by the floodwaters.

See also
Rivers of Korea
Geography of South Korea

References

External links
Simcheong Village website, discusses the Seomjin in detail
Gwangyang City profile of the river
 Naver Encyclopedia entry

Rivers of South Jeolla Province
Rivers of North Jeolla Province
Rivers of South Gyeongsang Province
Rivers of South Korea